Tropidophis haetianus, the Haitian dwarf boa, is a species of snake in the family Tropidophiidae. The species is endemic to the island of Hispaniola (Dominican Republic and Haiti) in the West Indies.

References

Tropidophiidae
Reptiles described in 1879
Snakes of the Caribbean
Reptiles of the Dominican Republic